Oswald Tanchot (born 7 August 1973) is a French professional football manager and former player.

Playing career
Tanchot started his career with Laval, and played 12 Ligue 2 matches for the club in the 1994–95 season. He went on to play in the French lower leagues for five different clubs in a ten-year period.

Managerial career
In 2005, Tanchot was appointed manager of Division d'Honneur side La Vitréenne and led the team to promotion in his first season. He remained with La Vitréenne until July 2011 when he was hired as the new manager of Le Poiré-sur-Vie, replacing Alain Ferrand.

In 2016, he was named assistant manager of Ligue 2 club Le Havre AC. Following Bob Bradley's departure to Swansea City Tanchot was named new manager of Le Havre. He left the post at the end of the 2018–19 season. Incredibly, after just one game in charge of Volos NPS in August 2022 he was sacked. Tanchot managed Volos to a 3-3 draw against Asteras Tripolis.

Managerial statistics

References

External links
 

1973 births
Living people
Sportspeople from Mayenne
French footballers
Association football forwards
Ligue 2 players
Stade Lavallois players
USF Fécamp players
AS Vitré players
US Avranches players
Canet Roussillon FC players
La Vitréenne FC players
French football managers
Le Havre AC managers
Amiens SC managers
Ligue 2 managers
Footballers from Pays de la Loire